{{speciesbox
| image = White-winged Diuca-Finch - Chile (23392277235).jpg
| status = LC
| status_system = IUCN3.1
| status_ref = 
| genus = Idiopsar
| species = speculifer
| authority = (Lafresnaye & d'Orbigny, 1837)
| synonyms = Emberiza speculifera (protonym)Diuca speculifera Chionodacryon speculiferum| range_map = Idiopsar speculifer map.svg

}}

The glacier finch (Idiopsar speculifer''), also known as the white-winged diuca finch and glacier bird,  is a species of bird in the tanager family Thraupidae.

It is found in Peru, Bolivia and far northern Chile and Argentina. Its natural habitat is subtropical or tropical high-altitude grassland, where  it favours wet boggy ground. It  is one of the few birds that have been recorded as nesting in high altitude glaciers, hence its  alternative name "the glacier bird". The nest is a bulky structure in the form of a cup, made of grass, twigs  and feathers: it can weigh up to half a pound, and may be laid directly  on the ice. Two eggs are laid in April or May; the young leave the nest in June or July.

References

External links
 Xeno-canto: audio recordings of the white-winged diuca finch
"14-Year-Old Helps Dad Solve Avian Mystery", MSNBC, November 27, 2008, retrieved July 20, 2014

glacier finch
glacier finch
glacier finch
Taxonomy articles created by Polbot
Taxobox binomials not recognized by IUCN